WAP four-disulfide core domain protein 2 - also known as Human Epididymis Protein 4 (HE4) - is a protein that in humans is encoded by the WFDC2 gene.

HE4 is a tumor marker of ovarian cancer, with 80% sensitivity at a cut-off of 150 pmol/L.

Function 

This gene encodes a protein that is a member of the WFDC domain family. The WFDC domain, or WAP Signature motif, contains eight cysteines forming four disulfide bonds at the core of the protein, and functions as a protease inhibitor in many family members. This gene is expressed in pulmonary epithelial cells, and was also found to be expressed in some ovarian cancers. The encoded protein is a small secretory protein, which may be involved in sperm maturation.

References

Further reading 

 
 
 
 
 
 
 
 
 
 
 

Biomarkers